Varsha Kripalsingh Choudhary (born 6 May 1992, Indore, Madhya Pradesh) is a Madhya Pradeshi cricketer. She is a right-handed batsman and bowls right-arm medium pace. She played for Madhya Pradesh and Central zone. She made her debut in major domestic cricket on 28 November 2006 in a one-day match against Rajasthan. She has played 7  First-class, 63 List A and 37 Twenty20 matches.

References 

1992 births
Madhya Pradesh women cricketers
Central Zone women cricketers
Living people
Cricketers from Indore
Sportswomen from Madhya Pradesh
21st-century Indian women
21st-century Indian people